The homeoptoton (from the Greek homoióptoton, "similar in the cases"), is a figure of speech consisting in ending the last words of a distinct part of the speech with the same syllable or letter.

Example 
"In necessariis unitas, in dubiis libertas, in omnibus caritas" ("In necessary things unity, in doubtful things liberty, in all things charity").

"Hominem laudem egentem virtutis, abundantem felicitates" ("Am I to praise a man abounding in good luck, but lacking in virtue?").

References 

Rhetorical techniques